Chiesa di Santa Giusta (Italian for Church of Santa Giusta)  is a  Romanesque church in L'Aquila (Abruzzo).

History

Architecture

References

External links

Giusta L'Aquila
Romanesque architecture in Abruzzo